Iannic-ann-ôd (Breton) – Ghost of a drowned person
 Iara (Brazilian) – Female water spirit
 Ibong Adarna (Philippine) – Bird that changes color when it finishes a song
 Ichchhadhari Nag (Hindu) – Shapeshifting venomous snakes
 Ichimoku-nyūdō (Japanese) – One-eyed kappa from Sado Island
 Ichiren-Bozu (Japanese) – Animated prayer beads
 Ichneumon (Medieval Bestiaries) – Dragon-killing animal
 Ichthyocentaur (Greek) – Human-fish-horse hybrid
 Iele (Romanian) – Female nature spirits
 Ifrit (Arabian) – Fire genie
 Ijiraq (Inuit) – Spirit that kidnaps children
 Ikiryō (Japanese) – Can be considered a 'living ghost', as it is a person's spirit outside their body
 Ikuchi (Japanese) – Sea serpent that travels over boats in an arc while dripping oil
 Iku-Turso (Finnish) – Sea monster
 Il-Belliegħa (Maltese) – Malevolent well spirit
 Imp (Medieval) – Small demonic servant
 Impundulu (Southern Africa) – Avian, vampiric lightning spirit
 Imugi (Korean) – Flightless, dragon-like creatures (sometimes thought of as proto-dragons)
 Inapertwa (Aboriginal) – Simple organisms, used by creator-gods to make everything else
 Incubus (Medieval folklore) – Male night-demon and seducer
 Indrik (Russian) – One-horned horse-bull hybrid
 Indus Worm (Medieval Bestiaries) – Giant, white, carnivorous worm
 Inkanyamba (Zulu) – Horse-headed serpent
 Inugami (Japanese) – Dog spirit
 Ior (Romanian) – Giant creature, with good spirit
 Ipotane (Greek) – Two-legged horse-human hybrid, (as opposed to the four-legged centaur)
 Ippon-datara (Japanese) – One-legged mountain spirit
 Iratxoak (Basque) – Small demonic servants
 Irin (Jewish) – Fallen angels
 Ishigaq (Inuit) – Little people
 Island Satyr (Medieval Bestiaries) – Savage human-goat hybrid from a remote island chain
 Isonade (Japanese) – Shark-like sea monster
 Ittan-momen (Japanese) – Ghostly aerial phenomenon that attacks people
 Iwana-bōzu (Japanese) – Char which appeared as a Buddhist monk

I